Charles Rew Quilter (May 5, 1926 – January 21, 2014) was an American and Canadian football player who played for the San Francisco 49ers, Edmonton Eskimos, BC Lions and Calgary Stampeders. He played college football at Tyler Junior College.

References

1926 births
2014 deaths
American players of Canadian football
BC Lions players
Calgary Stampeders players
Edmonton Elks players
Players of American football from Shreveport, Louisiana
San Francisco 49ers (AAFC) players
San Francisco 49ers players
Tyler Apaches football players
Canadian football defensive linemen